Sir Mark Rainsford (circa 1652 – November 1709) was an Irish Lord Mayor of Dublin and the original founder of what was to become the Guinness Brewery.

Political career
Sir Mark Rainsford was Lord Mayor of Dublin from 1700 to 1701. During his term as Lord Mayor, the King William III equestrian statue in College Green, Dublin was unveiled on 1 July 1701.
He had previously served as High Sheriff of Dublin City in 1689 and 1690.

Professional career

Rainsford is most noted as the original founder of the Guinness Brewery in St. James's Gate, Dublin. His business manufactured 'Beer and Fine Ales' and he was succeeded by his son - also named Mark Rainsford. In 1715, the business was leased to Captain Paul Espinasse. By 1750, the Rainsford family had resumed possession of the business and site. Rainsford's grandson, also called Mark Rainsford, signed over the now famous 9000 year lease to Arthur Guinness on 31 December 1759.

Personal life
Rainsford was married twice; His first wife was Jane Mee, the daughter of Giles Mee. He had three sons: Edward, Mark, Giles Mee, and several daughters. He acquired land in Portarlington in Queens County (later County Laois) as well as plantations in County Kildare and County Kilkenny.

In 1691, upon the death of his father-in-law, Giles Mee, Rainsford inherited water rights in the district around St. James's Gate and leveraged these rights to undertake his brewing business.

Rainsford was married for a second time, to Isabella Bolton, on 16 May 1695 in St. Michan's Church Dublin. He died in 1709, and Rainsford Street (which stands at the junction of Crane Street and the entrance to Guinness Brewery) was named in his honour.

Images

References

1650s births
1709 deaths
Year of birth uncertain
Businesspeople from County Dublin
Irish Anglicans
Irish brewers
Lord Mayors of Dublin
High Sheriffs of Dublin City
18th-century Irish businesspeople
17th-century Irish businesspeople